The National Achievement Test (NAT) is a standardized set of examinations taken in the Philippines by students in Grades 3, 6, 10, and 12. The test is designed to determine their academic levels, strength and weaknesses, as well as their knowledge learnt in major subjects throughout the year. 

NAT examinations aim to provide observational information on the achievement level of students to serve as guide for principals and teachers in their respective courses of action. It also identifies and analyzes variations on achievement levels across the years by region, division, school and other variables. It determines the rate of improvement in basic education with respect to individual schools within certain time frames.

History of the National Achievement Test 
The National College Entrance Examination (NCEE) was abolished in 1994 through Executive Order no. 632 by then Education Secretary Raul Roco and was replaced by the National Elementary Achievement Test (NEAT) and the National Secondary Achievement Test (NSAT). When the Department of Education, Culture and Sports (DECS) was officially converted into the Department of Education (DepEd), the NEAT and NSAT were also abolished and replaced by the National Achievement Test (NAT).

Purpose 
The test is a system-based assessment designed to gauge learning outcomes across target levels in identified periods of basic education. Empirical information on the achievement level of pupils/students serve as a guide for policy makers, administrators, curriculum planners, principles, and teachers, along with analysis on the performance of regions, divisions, schools, and other variables overseen by DepEd.

Structure 
The NAT is a standardized multiple-choice test that consists of several competencies with "moderately difficult items" based on Bloom's Taxonomy of Cognitive Objectives/Dimensions.

References

External links

Standardized tests
Department of Education (Philippines)